T. H. Musthafa (born 7 December 1941) is a Kerala politician who served as the Food Minister of Kerala from 1991 - 1995 while Karunakaran was the Chief Minister. He is a five-time legislator belonging to Indian National Congress.

Early life
Musthafa was born and brought up in a Muslim family named "Thottathil Kottappurath". He did his primary school education in his village and neighborhoods. His grandfather and family were appointed the tax collector of old royal family of central Travancore. His family name is considered as one of the oldest and traditional families of the state. Traditionally, they farmed to provide income for the family. His grandfather was a farmer and landlord.

Musthafa completed high school in 1965. He discontinued his studies due to lack of good schools in his neighborhoods.

It has visibly seen that Musthafa keeps young and educated people around him to compete with new generation leaders and politicians.

Political career
He started his party leadership at age 16 as per party records. He was a closest ally and loyalist of Indira Gandhi and Rajiv Gandhi. His political career was effected after their assassination.

 Positions held 

1957-1960 Youth Congress Mandalam President Vazhakulam
1962-1964 Youth Congress Perumbavoor Block President
1962-1965 Youth Congress Ernakulam District Gen. Secretary
1964-1968 President Perumbavoor Block Congress Committee
1966-1968 Gen. Secretary Ernakulam DCC
1968-1978 President Ernakulam DCC
1978-1983 Gen. Secretary KPCC 
1982, 1984 Deputy Leader Congress Legislative Party
1982-1986 Vice Chairman Kerala Khadi Industries Board
1983-1997 Vice President KPCC
Kerala Legislative Assembly Member (MLA) 1977
Kerala Legislative Assembly Member (MLA) 1982
Kerala Legislative Assembly Member (MLA) 1987
Kerala Legislative Assembly Member (MLA) 1991
1991-1995 Minister Food and Civil Supplies
Kerala Legislative Assembly Member (MLA) 2001

He recently finished 60+ years in Indian National Congress. The book related to his 60+ years political career in Congress was published by A.K. Antony.

He was the captain of Raj bhavan March from Manjeshwaram to Raj bhavan trivandrum covering a total distance of more than 1572 kilometres by foot.

He was elected as DCC (District Congress committee) president for 14 years in Cochin. He got selected for KPCC vice president, AICC member and much prestigious party leadership in Indian National Congress (INC). K. Karunakaran and Musthafa made the base for congress in Kerala at the time of party split, Indira Gandhi was their direct reports to Delhi.

His family includes social activists, farmers, engineers, doctors, management professionals as their profession. One of his brothers sri. T.H. Abdul Jabbar served as the Presidant of Vazakulam grama panchayath during 2010–2015. Shri. Musthafa became MLA for the first time in 1977, from Aluva constituency, as a Congress candidate. He was again elected as MLA in 1982, 1987, 1991 and 2001 from Kunnathunadu constituency. Lost elections at Aluva in 1980 and Kunnathunadu in 1996.

Musthafa served as the head for several Kerala government organizations including Kerala state khadi board. Lmtd, Rubber Marketing board. Lmtd, CIAL (Cochin International airport limited), etc. Noted educated IAS, IPS, IFS, IRS officers served Musthafa in his entire political career. Rather than his educational qualifications, Musthafa was considered a go-getter and trend maker politician of Kerala.

Controversies
When civil service officer Mr. Teeka Ram Meena IAS took action against the civil supply wheat scam of 7.5 crore Indian rupees and brought back the money to the state treasury, then the food minister of Kerala took action against him, the minister himself put bad comments in his confidential note (service book), transferred him to Poojappura to a small government office.  Later when Mr. E. K. Nayanar became the chief minister of Kerala, he himself changed the service book with respect to the report of Mr. C. P. Nair IAS and also CAG.

References

Indian National Congress politicians from Kerala
People from Ernakulam district
Indian Muslims
Malayali politicians
Year of birth uncertain
1941 births
Living people